District No. 48 School may refer to:

District No. 48 School (Dassel, Minnesota), in Collinwood Township, listed on the National Register of Historic Places in Meeker County, Minnesota
District No. 48 School (Franklin Township, Minnesota), listed on the National Register of Historic Places in Wright County, Minnesota